Karina Goricheva (born 8 April 1993) is a Kazakh weightlifter.

She competed at the 2016 Summer Olympics in Rio de Janeiro, where she won a bronze medal in the women's 63 kg.

References

1993 births
Living people
Kazakhstani female weightlifters
Olympic weightlifters of Kazakhstan
Weightlifters at the 2016 Summer Olympics
Olympic bronze medalists for Kazakhstan
Medalists at the 2016 Summer Olympics
Olympic medalists in weightlifting
Weightlifters at the 2014 Asian Games
Universiade medalists in weightlifting
Universiade silver medalists for Kazakhstan
Asian Games competitors for Kazakhstan
Medalists at the 2013 Summer Universiade
21st-century Kazakhstani women